Gathering Lake is a long, narrow lake in Thunder Bay District in northwestern Ontario, Canada. It is in the Great Lakes Basin.

The main inflow is the Namewaminikan River at the east. Secondary inflows are the Roslyn River at the south and Margret Creek northeast. The major outflow, at the north, is also the Namewaminikan River, which flows via Lake Nipigon and the Nipigon River to Lake Superior.

References

Other map sources:

Lakes of Thunder Bay District